The TZ-45 was an Italian blowback-operated submachine gun produced between 1944 and 1945, with an estimated 6,000 made.

History 
The TZ-45 submachine gun was designed by two Italians; Tonon  ("Toni") Giandoso, a colonel in the RSI Army and Zorzoli Giandoso, a gunsmith, and was produced by the Giandoso company. The vast majority of the estimated 6000 TZ 45s produced were issued to R.S.I. (Repubblica Sociale Italiana) units fighting against Italian partisan forces during the civil war in Northern Italy (1944–45). A few TZ-45 were possibly used by the Wehrmacht forces engaged in similar operations. After the war, the remaining guns were given to the military of the British and the American forces where they were evaluated.  The general opinion was unfavorable due to the style of manufacturing and finish.

The projects and manufacturing rights for the gun were later sold to the Burmese army where it was manufactured as the BA-52 and colloquially known as the "Ne Win STEN". The Burmese copies were roughly manufactured and unreliable.  The weapon remained in service into the mid-1980s with the Burmese infantry and into the early 1990s with support troops.

Design and construction 

The TZ-45 was manufactured by a stamped process and was then welded together with a simple finish applied. The blowback-operation was similar to other submachine guns at the time, though the return spring differed as it was assembled around a telescoping guide rod. A muzzle brake was fitted to the firearm, and the shoulder stock of the weapon was formed out of steel rods that slid alongside the receiver when retracted.  

Safety mechanisms for the gun included a fire selector that has a safe position that locks the bolt in the forward or rearward position, a grip safety behind the magazine housing preventing the bolt from moving in the direction of cocking or firing unless properly held, And a pin wedged in a specially designed notch in the bolt, preventing it from rolling back in case of accidental shock. 

Accidental discharges were a common occurrence in similar submachine guns such as the Sten gun and M3. However, the double safety system the TZ-45 utilized proved to be a breakthrough which would inspire later submachine guns, such as the Danish Madsen M50.

Users
 
  Italian partisans
  Burma

References

External links
 TZ-45 PDF at Small arms review
 TZ-45: Italy’s Late War Submachine Gun With Special Safety
 Drawing
 Firing range tests with a rare TZ-45
 Article on this firearm
 Modern Firearms information page

9mm Parabellum submachine guns
Submachine guns of Italy
World War II infantry weapons of Italy
World War II submachine guns
Cold War weapons of Myanmar